William McCutchan Morrison (1867–1918) was an American Presbyterian missionary best known for his involvement with a campaign for reform in the Congo. He was born on November 10, 1867, near Lexington, Virginia, and graduated in 1887 from Washington and Lee University.

References

1867 births
1918 deaths
American Presbyterian missionaries
Presbyterian missionaries in the Democratic Republic of the Congo
Washington and Lee University alumni
American expatriates in the Belgian Congo